Fra' Adrien de Wignacourt (1618 – 4 February 1697) was the 63rd Prince and Grand Master of the Order of Malta from 1690 to 1697.

He was the nephew of Fra Alof de Wignacourt. He was elected Grand Master after the death of Fra Gregorio Carafa in 1690.

He died in 1697 and was succeeded by Fra Ramon Perellos.

References

External links
 Coins of Grandmaster Adrien de Wignacourt

1697 deaths
Grand Masters of the Knights Hospitaller
Knights of Malta
Place of birth missing
1618 births
Burials at Saint John's Co-Cathedral